Marlin fishing (also called billfishing) is considered by some game fishermen to be a pinnacle of offshore game fishing, due to the size and power of the four marlin species and their relative rareness. Fishing for marlin captured the imagination of some sport fishermen in the 1930s, when well-known angler/authors Zane Grey, who fished for black, striped, and blue marlin in the Pacific, and Ernest Hemingway, who fished the Florida Keys, Bahamas and Cuba for Atlantic blue marlin and white marlin, wrote extensively about their pursuit and enthused about the sporting qualities of their quarry.

These days a lot of resources are committed to the construction of private and charter billfishing boats to participate in the billfishing tournament circuit. These are expensive purpose-built offshore vessels with powerfully driven deep sea hulls. They are often built to luxury standards and equipped with many technologies to ease the life of the deep sea recreational fisherman, including outriggers, flying bridges and fighting chairs, and state of the art fishfinders and navigation electronics.

Marlin are part of the billfish family, of which 10 species are of the most interest to anglers: Atlantic and Pacific blue marlin, black marlin, white marlin, striped marlin, Atlantic sailfish, Indo-Pacific sailfish, longbill spearfish, shortbill spearfish, and swordfish.

Blue marlin

The blue marlin of the Atlantic and Pacific oceans are more widely pursued by sport fishermen than any other marlin species. Their wide distribution in tropical oceanic waters and seasonally into temperate zones makes them available to many anglers, and their potential to reach great sizes and spectacular fighting ability makes them a highly desired catch to some anglers.

Biology and life history

A Pacific blue weighing  caught in 1970 by a party of anglers fishing out of Oahu, Hawaii, aboard the charter boat Coreene C skippered by Capt. Cornelius Choy (this fish often referred to as 'Choy's Monster') still stands as the largest marlin caught on rod and reel. In the Atlantic, the heaviest sport-fishing capture is Paulo Amorim's  fish from Vitoria, Brazil. Commercial fishermen have boated far larger specimens, with the largest blue marlin brought into Tsukiji market in Tokyo supposedly weighing a massive .

Large blue marlin have traditionally been amongst the most highly prized angling captures, and a fish weighing , a "grander", has historically been regarded by blue and black marlin anglers as the benchmark for a truly outstanding catch.  Today, much effort is still directed towards targeting big blue marlin, but smaller blues are also sought by anglers fishing lighter conventional tackle and big-game fly fishing gear.

Blue marlin occur widely in the tropical oceanic waters of the Atlantic and the Indo-Pacific, with many fish making seasonal migrations into the temperate waters of the Northern and Southern Hemispheres to take advantage of feeding opportunities as those waters in spring and summer.  Warm currents such as the Gulf Stream in the western Atlantic and the Agulhas Current in the western Indian Ocean serve as oceanic highways for blue marlin migration, and have a major influence on their seasonal distribution. Blue marlin have a limited ability to thermoregulate, and the lower limit of their temperature tolerance is thought to be in the region of about  although individual fish have been caught in cooler temperatures.  Larger individuals have the greatest temperature tolerance, and blue marlin encountered at the limits of their range tend to be large fish.  This wide distribution brings blue marlin in contact with anglers in many parts of the world.

Blue marlin are eclectic feeders preying on a wide range of prey species and sizes. Scientific examination of blue marlin stomach contents has yielded organisms as small as miniature filefish. Common food items include tuna-like fishes, particularly skipjack tuna and frigate mackerel (also known as frigate tuna), squid, mackerel, and scad. Of more interest to sport fishermen is the upper range of blue marlin prey size. A  white marlin has been recorded as being found in the stomach of a  blue marlin caught at Walker's Cay in the Bahamas, and more recently, during the 2005 White Marlin Open, a white marlin in the  class was found in the stomach of one of the money-winning blues. Shortbill spearfish of  have been recorded as feed items by Kona blue marlin fishermen.

Fishing techniques
Fishing styles and gear used in the pursuit of blue marlin vary, depending on the size of blue marlin common to the area, the size of fish being targeted, local sea conditions, and often local tradition. The main methods used by sport fishermen are fishing with artificial lures, rigged natural baits, or live bait.

Natural bait fishing
The pioneers of blue marlin angling employed natural baits rigged to skip and swim.  Today, rigged baits, particularly Spanish mackerel and horse ballyhoo continue to be widely used for blue marlin.  Also, the American eel is considered to be one of the best rigged baits due to its natural swim tendencies when properly rigged.  Trolling for blue marlin with rigged baits, sometimes combined with an artificial lure or skirt to make "skirted baits" or "bait/lure combinations", is still widely practiced, especially along the eastern seaboard of the United States and in the Bahamas, the Caribbean, and Venezuela.  Rigged natural baits are also used as "pitch baits" that are deployed after fish are raised to hookless lures or "teasers".

Artificial lure fishing
Blue marlin are aggressive fish that respond well to the splash, bubble trail, and action of a well-presented artificial lure.  Trolling with lures is probably the most popular technique used by blue marlin crews today.  Hawaii is recognized as the birthplace of lure trolling for marlin, with skippers operating from the Kona Coast of the Big Island of Hawaii developing many designs still used today.  The earliest marlin lures were carved from wood, cast in drink glasses, or made from chrome bath towel pipes and skirted with rubber inner tubes or vinyl upholstery material cut into strips. Today, marlin lures are produced in a huge variety of shapes, sizes, and colours, mass-produced by large manufacturers and individually crafted by small-scale, custom makers.

A typical marlin lure is a small, medium to large ( or more) artificial with a shaped plastic or metal head to which a plastic skirt is attached. The design of the lure head, particularly its face, gives the lure its individual action when trolled through the water. Lure actions range from an active side-to-side swimming pattern to pushing water aggressively on the surface to, most commonly, tracking along in a straight line with a regular surface pop and bubble trail. Besides the shape, weight, and size of the lure head, the length and thickness of skirting, the number and size of hooks, and the length and size of the leader used in lure rigging all influence the action of the lure: how actively it will run and how it will respond to different sea conditions. Experienced anglers often fine-tune their lures to get the action they want.

These speeds allow quite substantial areas to be effectively worked in a day's fishing. A pattern of four or more lures is trolled at varying distances behind the boat. Lures may be fished either straight from the rod tip ("flat lines"), or from outriggers.

Live-bait fishing
Live-bait fishing for blue marlin normally uses small tuna species, with skipjack generally considered the best choice. As trolling speed is limited because baits must be trolled slowly to remain alive, live-baiting is normally chosen where fishing areas are relatively small and easily covered, such as nearfish aggregating device buoys and in the vicinity of steep underwater ledges.

Blue marlin angling destinations
Areas where bottom structure (islands, seamounts, banks, and the edge of the continental shelf) creates upwelling, which brings deep nutrient-rich water close to the surface, are particularly favoured by blue marlin.

Atlantic
In the western Atlantic, blue marlin may be found as far north as George's Bank and the continental shelf canyons off Cape Cod, influenced by the warm current of the Gulf Stream, and as far south as southern Brazil. In the eastern Atlantic, their seasonal range extends northward to the Algarve coast of Portugal and southward to the southern coast of Angola.

Atlantic blue marlin were first consistently caught by sport fishermen in the early 1930s, when anglers from Florida began to explore the Bahamas. Authors such as Ernest Hemingway and S. Kip Farrington did much to attract the attention of big-game anglers to the Bahamian islands of Bimini and Cat Cay. After the Second World War, and especially from the 1960s onwards, anglers began pursuing and finding blue marlin in destinations all over the tropical and subtropical Atlantic.

Bahamas
The Bahama Islands have long been popular destinations for fishermen seeking blue marlin.  Bimini, located at the eastern edge of the Gulf Stream, has the longest history of blue marlin fishing in the islands, dating back to the 1930s and 1940s when anglers such as Michael Lerner, Ernest Hemingway, and S. Kip Farrington fished there . From the 1960s, more outlying areas such as Walker's Cay and the Abaco islands have developed as blue marlin grounds.  The Bahamas is home to one of the most intensely competitive tournament series in marlin fishing, the Bahamas Billfish Championship.

Bermuda
The banks lying off the hook-shaped island of Bermuda consistently produce blue marlin. A  giant boated aboard the Mako IV, skippered by Captain Allen DeSilva, in 1995, stands as the largest blue marlin caught in Bermudian waters. This fish is also one of the largest blue marlin ever boated in the Atlantic.

A series of tournaments attracts many top-notch boats and crews from the United States every summer. Visiting boats and crews join a small but well-equipped and experienced fleet of charter vessels.

Brazil
Blue marlin are fished by sport fishermen operating from several locations along the Atlantic coast of Brazil. Blue marlin have been encountered as far south as São Paulo, and are regularly hooked and caught in annual tournaments held offshore of Rio de Janeiro.

The city of Vitória is considered one of the finest locations for blue marlin fishing by many anglers. Fishing is a popular activity in Vitória, attracting fishermen from other states and countries due to the large population of marlin and sailfish off the coast of Espirito Santo.

Cape Verde Islands
This cluster of islands in the eastern tropical Atlantic has proved to be an outstanding blue marlin fishery since it was first seriously fished in the 1980s. Blue marlin may be caught year-round in Cape Verde, but the best fishing seems to take place between March and May when large numbers of blue marlin concentrate in island waters. The biggest catch from Cape Verde waters is a  fish caught in September 2006 near the island of Saint Vincent by angler Barry Silleman fishing with skipper Berno Niebuhr. Incidental catches include wahoo and large yellowfin tuna.

Mexico (Atlantic coast)
In the eastern Yucatán, charter boats operating from Cozumel, Isla Mujeres and Playa del Carmen encounter blue marlin in addition to numerous white marlin and sailfish from late March through July, when the waters of the Gulf Stream bring billfish through the area. These blue marlin of the western Caribbean tend to be smaller. While large specimens can top ,  fish are far more common.

Portugal
Although blue marlin are being caught in increasing numbers on the Algarve coast of Portugal, the main centres of blue marlin fishing in Portugal are the oceanic islands of the Azores and Madeira.

The small port of Horta on Faial Island is synonymous with blue marlin fishing in the nine-island chain of the Azores. The season normally begins in late June or early July and continues until weather conditions put an end to the fishery in mid- to late October. Weather conditions can be unpredictable at the end of the season, but in midsummer when the area is dominated by the Azores high, the seas can be very flat.

Although blue marlin can be found close to Faial, boats seeking them often select three banks that serve as productive feeding locations for these fish. The Azores sits in the northern extreme of blue marlin distribution and the fishery is dominated by large fish. The Azores is home to Atlantic blue marlin records for, amongst others, IGFA -line classes.

Blue marlin fishing in Madeira was pioneered by local anglers in the 1960s and 1970s, and a number of large blue marlin were caught during the 1980s, but the focus for most visiting anglers tended to be sharks and the prolific schools of bigeye tuna.

Between 1997 and 2000, blue marlin fishing in Madeira, along with the other Atlantic islands, underwent a severe downturn, blamed by many on the strong El Niño event of 1996–1997.  From 2001 onwards, conditions began to improve, and the seasons of 2005 and 2006 have seen Madeira return to some of its former glory. June and July appear to be the premier months for blue marlin fishing. A small fleet of charter boats operate out of the small marina in the island's largest town, Funchal.  The most popular fishing grounds are situated on the south coast of the island, sheltered by the high cliffs from the prevailing northeast trade winds. Fishing generally takes place within a few miles of the island and many great fish are caught well within  of the shoreline. Lure fishing is the most successful method with a wide variety of medium to large artificials from various sources being successful.

Spain
Although a number of blue marlin have been brought into ports along the Atlantic coast of mainland Spain, the subtropical archipelago of the Canary Islands is by far the most prolific blue marlin grounds in Spain. Blue marlin appear seasonally in the Canary Islands between May and October, with some individuals having been caught earlier and later in the year. Smaller fish in the  class also make an appearance at times.

Sport fishing boats may be chartered from the main islands of Lanzarote, Fuerteventura, and Tenerife; from the smaller islands of Graciosa and La Gomera; and from Puerto Rico de Gran Canaria on the island of Gran Canaria, which has historically been the main destination for marlin fishing there and still boasts the largest fleet of charter boats in the islands. Blue marlin are caught both offshore and inside the island's shelf, which often holds abundant schools of bait fish, mainly mackerel and scad.

United States
The Outer Banks of North Carolina have long been known for their blue marlin fishing. Since the early 1950s when Ernal Foster on the Albatross I made the first charter fishing trips for blue marlin, Cape Hatteras has been known as an important destination for the sport fisherman. Other important fishing centers include Morehead City, home to the famous Big Rock Blue Marlin Tournament, and Oregon Inlet. The proximity of the Gulf Stream and of the continental shelf edge in the Cape Hatteras area create a productive combination of current, blue water, and ocean temperature that attracts a wide variety of gamefish including blue marlin.

While the average size of a blue marlin is typically , big fish inhabit these waters. North Carolina was home to the former all-tackle world record Atlantic blue marlin, a  fish that also stood as the world record for  class tackle for over 17 years.

Venezuela
Venezuela's La Guaira Bank has some of the most prolific blue marlin fishing in the Atlantic. Blue marlin are present year round with particularly good numbers in spring. Trolling with ballyhoo baits using relatively light tackle, often in the  class, is popular for the variety of billfish species that can make an appearance in these waters.

Virgin Islands

The island of St Thomas in the US Virgin Islands is one of the most renowned blue marlin destinations. Full moons from June to October can accompany some intense blue marlin fishing in the area known as the 'North Drop'. Lure fishing, trolling natural baits, and bait and switch are all popular.

Indo-Pacific

In the Pacific, blue marlin are seasonally found as far north as southern Japan and as far south as the Bay of Plenty in the North Island of New Zealand. Blue marlin in the eastern Pacific migrate as far north as Southern California and as far south as northern Peru. The southern limit of their distribution in the eastern Indian Ocean appears to be the waters of Albany and Perth in Western Australia, and in the western Indian Ocean blue marlin have been taken as far south as Cape Town.

Blue marlin have probably been known to Japanese high-seas fishermen for centuries. However, the Pacific blue marlin was not officially considered to be a separate species (though still debated) until 1954; prior to then, Pacific blues were known as "silver marlin" or often confused with black marlin. The capture of a  Pacific blue marlin by skipper George Parker of Kona, Hawaii, was instrumental in clearing up the identification of Pacific marlin species. Hawaii has continued to be the major center of blue marlin fishing in the Pacific, and Hawaiian blue marlin techniques have been disseminated throughout the Pacific Basin by travelling anglers and crews, influencing blue marlin fisheries as distant as Japan and Australia.

Australia
Blue marlin range on both the east and west coasts of Australia, with fish being recorded as far south as the Tasmanian east coast and Albany on the west coast.

Notable regions to fish for blue marlin in Australia are off Cairns, southern Queensland from Fraser Island to the Gold Coast, Port Stephens and Sydney, the New South Wales south coast region, Rottnest Island off Perth, and Exmouth and Broome in Western Australia. On the east Australian coast, blue marlin are a popular target for anglers fishing from such ports as Port Stephens, Sydney, and the southern ports of Ulladulla, Batemans Bay, and Bermagui. However, the best scores in terms of numbers of fish have come from boats fishing the Gold Coast.

A blue marlin over  has been officially recorded in Australian waters, several blue marlin over  have been boated or released by Australian anglers; fish larger than a thousand pounds have been hooked, but none so far landed.  The Australian record capture (which is also the ladies' all-tackle world record) weighed just under . Its weight, was caught on  tackle whilst fishing from Batemans Bay on the Australian New South Wales south coast. Apparently, it took some time for the fish to be weighed, which almost certainly robbed the angler of a fish reaching . This fish was caught in March 1999 by the then 27-year-old female angler Melanie Kisbee fishing from a boat named Radiant, a  Bertram, which was captained by the late Paul Gibson. The fish was caught on a Topgun lure called "Awesome" in blue and pink.

Previous Australian records have been held by a  fish also captured from the port of Batemans Bay during the Tollgate Island Classic, a capture which helped to put Batemans Bay on the map for big blue marlin, and a fish of around  captured in Bermagui by angler Wayne Cummings.  A large marlin washed up on a beach in Western Australia weighing  in June 2013.

Larger blue marlin appear to be captured in years when the water temperate is warmer than usual. On the New South Wales coast, water temperatures of  brought down the coast by the warmer south east current appear to produce the best blue marlin fishing and the largest blue marlin.  The fishing season in Australia for blue marlin is January to May–June.

Lure fishing, live bait and switch-baiting are all used successfully for blue marlin in Australia.  Blue marlin are targeted by some anglers and are also encountered whilst fishing for the more abundant striped marlin.

Ecuador
For more than 60 years, the waters of the Humboldt Current which sweep past Peru and Ecuador have been fished by sports fishermen.

In 1951, a group of mainly American sports fishermen set up the Cabo Blanco Fishing Club at Cabo Blanco in the far north of Peru, close to the border with Ecuador. Some of the greatest marlin fishing in the world took place here until the club closed in the 1960s.

Today, the main centres for fishing this area of the Pacific coast are further north, in Ecuador, and the fishery has shifted from the pioneer fishing locations inshore, where black marlin and swordfish were fished by presenting baits to sighted fish, to further offshore for blue marlin, striped marlin, and tuna. Salinas is the most well-known billfishing location, and seasonally offers good fishing for large striped marlin, as well as blue marlin and other gamefish, such as bigeye tuna. The other popular blue marlin destination in the country is Manta, which is usually in season when Salinas is not. A large fleet of sport-fishing vessels operates from both towns. Blues in this area are known to reach large sizes, with the most notable capture being a  fish boated by local angler Jorge Jurado which formerly held the IGFA -class record.

Hawaii
More blue marlin are probably caught by rod and reel in the Hawaiian Islands than anywhere in the world. Over 60 fish over  have been weighed in Hawaiian waters, including the two largest marlin caught on rod and reel: a  fish caught from Oahu by Capt. Cornelius Choy and a  fish caught off Kona by angler Gary Merriman aboard the Black Bart, skippered by Capt. Bart Miller, in March 1984.

The town of Kona on the lee coast of the island of Hawaii is internationally known for its blue marlin fishing, the skill and experience of its top skippers (many of whom are also skilled lure makers), and its long-standing Hawaiian International Billfish Tournament. A large fleet of sport-fishing vessels operates from Honokohau Harbor. Blue marlin skippers in the Hawaiian Islands employ both lure-fishing and live-baiting techniques.

New Zealand
However, Pacific blue marlin captures have increased in New Zealand over the last 10 years, and blue marlin are now consistently caught from along the eastern coast of the North Island. The Waihau Bay and Cape Runaway area is particularly well known for blue marlin. Blue marlin encountered in New Zealand tend to be of large average size with most averaging . Larger specimens in the -plus class are hooked and landed every year. Most New Zealand blue marlin are taken by lure fishing, with a wide variety of locally made and imported lures being popular.

Tahiti

Offshore fishing in Tahiti began to develop in earnest in the 1960s, following the establishment of the Haura (marlin) Club of Tahiti in 1962. Today, seven gamefishing clubs exist in the Society Islands.

Vanuatu

The island nation of Vanuatu appears to be the premier destination for blue marlin in the South Pacific and one of the best fisheries for Pacific blues in the world. A ratified  fish was landed in August 2007.

Black marlin

Black marlin (Makaira indica) are found in the Indian and Pacific Oceans with some vagrant individuals having been reported from the south Atlantic.

Fishing techniques

Black marlin fishing has traditionally conducted with rigged dead baits, both skipping and swimming. In the historic Cabo Blanco fishery, little blind trolling was done; instead, the billfish (striped marlin, black marlin, and swordfish) were sighted cruising or finning on the surface and baited. In the Cairns fishery, a wide variety of baitfish species are used successfully, including kawa kawa and other small tunas, queenfish, and scad.

The use of live bait is also popular for targeting both large and small black marlin, and under the right circumstances, is extremely effective, although sharks and other nontargeted gamefish can often be a problem with this method. Small live baits such as slimy mackerel and yellowtail scad are highly effective for juvenile black marlin, and are fished both by slow trolling and drifting. The use of a downrigger has proven to be helpful in positioning baits deeper in the water column.

The prevalence of lure-damaging bycatch such as wahoo, barracuda, and Spanish (narrowbarred) mackerel in some areas can make lure fishing an expensive proposition. However, the faster pace of lure fishing allows larger areas to be searched effectively, which can be an advantage if the fish seem more dispersed.

Angling destinations

Africa
Bazaruto Archipelago in Mozambique is a premier destination for giant black marlin. This fishery was discovered in the mid-1950s from the very basic fleet operating from Santa Carolina Island. Until the mid-1970s when the country erupted in a 20-year civil war, many fish over the magical  barrier were caught. Marlin fishing in the archipelago is making a big comeback, and is probably one of the world's best-kept secrets. Few but good professional operations (mainly from Indigo Bay Island Resort) fish the area for black marlin from September to January, and international anglers are finding the war years left the resource virtually untouched. Skip, swim, and live baits are the most traditional methods, but crews have experimented with lures over the past few seasons with great success.
Australia

In February 1913, Mark Lidwill, fishing off Port Stephens, brought in the first black marlin ever caught on rod and reel.

Today, the Australian town of Cairns is considered the world capital of black marlin fishing. The Great Barrier Reef is the only confirmed breeding ground for black marlin, as they synchronize their breeding with the myctophid breeding aggregations and coral spawns of September, October, and November.  The majority of sport-fishing effort for black marlin off the Great Barrier Reef takes place from Lizard Island to Cairns.

Many domestic and international anglers visit the region during the September to November period in the hope of catching the "fish of a lifetime".

Black marlin travel south along the east Australian coast during the Southern Hemisphere summer, and are fished for by many anglers along the Queensland and New South Wales coasts. Port Stephens, the site of the first black marlin capture on rod and reel, is one of the most popular fishing areas for black marlin today, and is the site of the Southern Hemisphere's largest billfish tournament, the Port Stephens Interclub.

Costa Rica

Quepos in Costa Rica is known for its production of trophy billfish. Anglers from all over have traveled and caught all three species of Marlin, in these exceptional fishing conditions. It has been known that anglers have caught Black Marlin in excess of 1,500 pounds and 16 feet in length. One of the most common tactics to catch the Black Marlin is with live large Bonita or big ballyhoo on a slow troll. In fact, Ernest Hemingway caught an exceptionally large Marlin in Quepos, reaching a length of 18 feet, adding to the reputation for these legendary waters.

In particular, one reason Quepos is known for the high numbers of Marlin caught is the FAD’s that are offshore. The FAD’s are Fish Aggregating Devices that essentially attracts open ocean fish such as the Marlin to a buoy located offshore. This increases the fish in one area and allows for anglers to have record setting numbers on single day trips offshore. But this does not only attract big Black Marlin, the area is also known for some of the world’s best Sailfish and Blue Marlin fishing. In a single day tournament in 2015, there were 940 sailfish released in the waters off of Quepos. Home to many fly fishing world records, Quepos is a place in the history books, whether it is the trophy size to the Pacific Ocean billfish or the way they have been caught throughout history, the fishing here does not look to be slowing down anytime soon.

Ecuador
The inshore grounds off the high white cliffs became known as 'Marlin Boulevard' for the numbers and size of the black marlin taken there. Greatest of the many granders captured here was the  black marlin boated by Texas oilman Alfred C. Glassell, Jr., in August 1953. The Cabo Blanco Fishing Club, where most fishing operations were based, closed down in the late 1960s following a period of political upheaval in Peru. Around the same time, the Peruvian sport fishery also crashed following the overfishing of the primary baitfish, anchoveta.

Black marlin are still found in Peruvian waters, but the main sport-fishing destination in the region nowadays is further north in Salinas, Ecuador. Black marlin are normally outnumbered in catch reports by the more prolific striped and blue marlin, but some big fish continue to be caught. The traditional method of sport fishing is trolling with natural baits, large ballyhoo being commonly used, while searching for finning fish.

Mexico
Black marlin are consistently, although seldom frequently, caught in Cabo San Lucas and other Mexican fishing centres. Black marlin, along with blue marlin, are the targets of the biggest-paying marlin tournament in the world, the Bisbee's Black & Blue, which is fished in the waters off Cabo San Lucas in October. At present, the offshore structures such as Corbetana Rock and "El Banco" off Puerto Vallarta appear to offer the best fishing for black marlin in Mexican waters.

The large vessels of the San Diego Long Range fleet have also caught some hefty blacks in the -plus range while fishing for yellowfin tuna at the Revillagigedos Islands. Black marlin in Mexican waters, as in most other parts of their range, tend to associate with reefs, banks, and similar offshore structures. Slow-trolling live baits such as skipjack tuna over these structures tends to be the most effective way to target black marlin. Downriggers are sometimes used to fish baits deeper.

Panama
This fish is believed to be the first black marlin of over  caught on rod and reel.

Today, the productive reef areas in Piñas Bay, and the many other reefs and islands along the Pacific coast of Panama, particularly Coiba Island in the Gulf of Chiriqui, still have probably the best fishing for black marlin in the Western Hemisphere. Piñas Bay plays home to Tropic Star Lodge, and their renowned fleet dating back to 1961. Black marlin averaging  hunt schools of rainbow runners, black skipjack, and other prey over these structures along with large Pacific sailfish and dorado. Slow trolling with bridle-rigged live skipjack is the predominant technique used to target black marlin by the Tropic Star fleet. At Coiba Island, the Hannibal Banks is among most productive areas where trolling lures is employed successfully.

Striped marlin

Striped marlin (Tetrapturus audax) occur in the Indian and Pacific Oceans.

Fishing techniques

Live bait fishing

In Mexican hot spots such as Cabo San Lucas and in Southern California, anglers cast live baits such as mackerel and caballito (scad) to striped marlin that may be sighted feeding or finning on the surface.

Conventional live-bait trolling at slow speeds is also highly effective when concentrations of marlin can be located. Experienced skippers fishing from ports such as Bermagui on the south coast of New South Wales have in the recent past racked up scores of over 100 striped marlin per season fishing this relatively simple technique at the right time at the right place. Larger baits such as kahawai and skipjack tuna are often used for the large striped marlin of New Zealand.

Deep-dropping live baits with the aid of sinkers can bring live baits deeper to feeding fish. This tactic is frequently used in Mexico and Australia. It is considered somewhat lowbrow (it has been described as "snapper fishing for marlin"), but is nonetheless highly effective when deep-feeding activity occurs.

Angling destinations

Mexico
More striped marlin are caught recreationally at the Mexican tourist mecca of Cabo San Lucas than anywhere else in the world.  The local fishing banks and offshore grounds are fished by large fleets of local and American sport fishing boats. Striped marlin may be caught year-round in Cabo waters, but the heaviest concentrations seem to show up in late autumn, and good numbers stay around into the spring. On 9 Dec 2007 during the Mini, WCBRT team Reelaxe released a total of 330 striped marlin in the two-day tournament, setting another tournament record for a single team in two days, with a new record of 190 striped marlin in one day. The team consisted of Chris Badsey, Dave Brackmann, Steve Brackmann, Alex Rogers, Jose Espanoza, Mark Clayton, Saul Contrearus, and Dennis Poulton. The top angler was Reelaxe angler Jose Esponoza, with a personal best and tournament record of 59 released striped marlin in a single day. Prior to that, in November 2007, the crew of the sport fishing vessel Reelaxe, fishing on the Finger Bank, set a one-day catch record of 179 striped marlin.

Australia
Although Australia is known for its black, and more recently blue, marlin fishery, striped marlin are often found in the subtropical waters of the vast island continent and are a popular target for Australian anglers. The country's largest interclub tournament is held at the Port Stephens area of New South Wales, and has produced several striped marlin records on ultralight and fly tackle. Larger striped marlin in the -plus class often show up in the southern part of their range.  Batemans Bay, Ulladulla and Bermagui are where fish of this class can be encountered. Live baiting, with such baits as slimy mackerel and skipjack tuna, and trolling artificial lures are the two most common techniques here, but many top crews have experienced success with fly-rod and light-tackle records using the bait-and-switch technique.

Ecuador
The Galapagos Islands are home to great concentrations of striped marlin.  "Sport fishing" is technically prohibited in the Galapagos, but visitors may legally engage in what is known as pesca vivencial, or recreational fishing with licensed local guides. Guides targeting marlin operate from the island of San Cristobal. The warmer "wet" season between December and June is best for higher numbers, but larger striped marlin (-plus range) are caught during the colder late summer months.

Striped marlin are also fished from the Ecuadorian mainland. Salinas in the southern part of the country and Manta further north are the main sport-fishing bases in Ecuador. The cold Humboldt Current from the south meets the equatorial current along the Ecuadorian coastline, and when conditions are right, the combination of current, colour, and temperature breaks amass concentrations of baitfish that attract large striped marlin, as well as larger blue and black marlin, yellowfin, and bigeye tuna.

Kenya
Striped marlin are one of three marlin species that appear in east African waters. Kenya has the most well-developed sport fishery in this region, and every year, boats from Malindi, Lamu, and Watamu in the north, as well as Shimoni in the south, have excellent striped marlin fishing.

New Zealand
Marlin fishing in New Zealand waters dates back to the turn of the 20th century. Some New Zealand anglers, often fishing in small trailerable boats, pursue striped marlin from Houhoura and the North Cape in the far north of the country to as far south as Gisborne, Raglan, and Napier in the south. Lure fishing is a popular fishing technique used by New Zealand marlin fishermen, with many good fish also being taken on live and rigged dead baits.

White marlin

White marlin (Tetrapturus albidus) are distributed throughout the tropical and seasonally temperate oceanic waters of the Atlantic. They are a premier light-tackle gamefish.

The "hatchet marlin", long thought to be a variant of the white marlin distinguished by dorsal and anal fins with a chopped-off rather than rounded appearance, has recently been confirmed as a separate species in the genus Tetrapturus, the roundscale spearfish.  Nearly indistinguishable from white marlin, most tournaments treat hatchet marlin catches as white marlin.  Both species are fished for in the same way.

White marlin feed on a variety of schooling baitfish, including sardine, herring, and other clupeoids; squid; mackerel; scad; saury; and smaller tuna-like fishes, such as frigate and bullet tuna.  Like their close relatives the striped marlin, and sailfish, white marlin will often group together to corral schooling baitfish into a tight group for feeding purposes, a phenomenon commonly referred to as "balling bait".  When this occurs, it is common for two or more fish to be raised to the baits or hooked up simultaneously.

Angling destinations

Where environmental conditions (temperature, water colour and clarity) are favourable, white marlin often forage in shallow water well inshore of the continental shelf, taking advantage of the abundant baitfish resources often found in these areas.

Brazil

Brazil is home to most of the largest white marlin in the International Game Fish Association (IGFA) record books. Areas such as the Charlotte Bank have large numbers of white marlin, as well as blue marlin, sailfish, and other blue-water gamefish such as tuna and dorado.

United States

Cape Hatteras, Oregon Inlet, and other fishing areas along the coast of North Carolina benefit from the close proximity of the Gulf Stream. White marlin are often targeted by the skilled charter crews and recreational sport fisherman who fish this area, with August and September often providing some exceptional fishing.

From around mid-July onwards, white marlin, as well as the other species of Gulf Stream gamefish such as dolphinfish, yellowfin, and bigeye tuna, start showing up in the continental shelf canyons offshore of Maryland, Virginia and Delaware. White marlin were first caught here as early as 1934, and in 1939, 171 whites were caught in a single day (29 July). The years 1969-1971 had some exceptional white marlin fishing with over 2,000 fish being caught or released per year.

Venezuela

The La Guaira Bank off the coast of Venezuela hosts great concentrations of white marlin in season. White marlin can be encountered year-round, but autumn is considered the best time to target them in Venezuelan waters.  Venezuelan anglers such as Aquiles Garcia, Rafael Arnal, Ronnie Morrison, and Ruben Jaen honed their techniques and tackle in these fish-rich waters, and their experiences have contributed to many light-tackle billfishing techniques commonly used today.

Threats

The main threat to marlin, along with other highly migratory pelagic fish, is commercial fishing. Billfish of all species are taken as commercial targets and as bycatch in tuna and swordfish fisheries.

Another major threat to marlin are recreational competitions that run using "catch anything" practices, such as longline fishing, driftnet fishing and other indiscriminate methods. There is also insufficient regulation to ensure that fisheries comply with rules.

Hypoxia may also be a threat to billfish populations due to the widespread decrease in life-supporting oxygen levels in more and more large areas of our oceans.

In 2010, Greenpeace International added the striped marlin, white marlin, Atlantic blue marlin, black marlin, and Indo-pacific blue marlin to its "seafood red list".

Conservation

Founded in 1986 by Winthrop P. Rockefeller, The Billfish Foundation (TBF) is a nonprofit organization dedicated to conserving billfish and associated species worldwide which helps ensure healthy oceans and strong coastal economies. TBF's signature research project is the traditional tag and release program that uses the efforts of anglers to provide data and research to scientists and fisheries managers. Awareness of the need to conserve billfish stocks worldwide has led to an increasing trend for recreational anglers and skippers to release their catches in as healthy a condition as possible. In some areas of the world, commercial fishing for striped, black and blue marlin has been banned.

References

External links
Pacific Ocean Research Foundation
The Billfish Foundation
2016 Blue Marlin Classic

Recreational fishing